MK7 may refer to:
An English postcode area
MK vitamin K2, Menaquinone.
Mortal Kombat: Armageddon
Mario Kart 7, a 2011 Nintendo 3DS game